De Hondt is a Dutch surname. "De Hondt" is an old spelling of Dutch de hond ("the dog"). In the 16th and 17th century it has been variably Latinized as Hondius, Canis and Canisius.† Contracted forms of the surname are D'Hondt and Dhondt. People with the name De Hondt include:

De Hondt
Cornelius de Hondt (c.1505–1562), Flemish composer, singer, and choir director better known as Cornelius Canis
Gheerkin de Hondt (died 1547), Dutch composer of polyphonic songs
Hendrik de Hondt (1573–1650), Flemish-Dutch engraver and cartographer better known as Hendrik Hondius
Joost de Hondt (1563–1612), Flemish engraver and cartographer better known as Jodocus Hondius
Lambert de Hondt the Elder (c.1620–1665), Flemish painter and draughtsman
De Hond
Maurice de Hond (born 1947), Dutch pollster and entrepreneur
 (1882–1943), Dutch Jewish theologian
Dehond
Joren Dehond (born 1995), Belgian footballer

Notes
† Saint Peter Canisius (1521–1597), his half-brother Theodorich Canisius (1532–1606) and nephew Henricus Canisius (1562–1610) were themselves not known by the name de Hond(t). Their family had carried the (Latinized) name Canis since the early 15th-century.

See also
 Dhondt
 D'Hondt

References

Dutch-language surnames
Surnames of Belgian origin